The Portuguese controlled Goa until 1961, when India took over. Only a very small fraction of Goans speak Portuguese nowadays. Although an essential religious language, there were 1,500 students learning Portuguese in Goa in 2015; totaling a number of 10,000 – 12,000 Portuguese speakers in the state.

History 
The history of the Portuguese language in Goa can be traced back to the 15th century, with the arrival of the Portuguese and their rule in the region for over 400 years. Under Portuguese rule, Portuguese was used extensively in government and in the education system. In addition to official government media, Portuguese was also used by religious missionaries, coexisting with many other native languages.

After 1961 
Portuguese rule in Goa came to an end in 1961 after the liberation of Portuguese Goa by Indian armed forces. There was a very complicated impasse halting the use of Portuguese, which ceased to be the official language. O Heraldo, the Portuguese-language daily newspaper in Goa was renamed The Herald. and adopted the use of English. Portuguese was used along with English in subordinate legislation in the State Gazette until the year 1972, when it was replaced by Marathi and Konkani. Portuguese remained one of the languages of the Subordinate Courts along with Marathi and Konkani until 1969. In 1964, under the aegis of the Bombay High Court, a programme was started to retrain Goan Judges, Lawyers, and Court officials, to write and understand pleadings in English, to enable the eventual abolition of Portuguese as language of pleadings in 1969–70.

There was a strengthening of diplomatic relations between Portugal and India after 1974, with the installation of Portuguese institutions such as the Consulate-General in Panaji in 1992 and the Instituto Português do Oriente and Fundação Oriente. Because of this, there was once again demand for the Portuguese language.

Other legacies 

The presence of the language over the years in the Indian state is with a small population of native speakers. Other legacies such as street names, were left untouched. In the city of Vasco da Gama, the most populous Goan city, surnames like Mascarenhas and Souza are quite common in the territory, and stand as a testimony to the Portuguese occupancy.

It's debatable whether the Goan territory formed an Indo-Portuguese Creole, unlike other regions of India and of the world where there was sustained Portuguese contact with local populations.

Some authors such as Theban (1985) and Thomas (1995) consider, unlike Holm (1989) and Clemens (1996, 2000), that the very strong pressure from the Portuguese, in the official language and education, would have prevented the formation of a creole Portuguese in Goa.

However, according to Rita Marquilhas (1998), in places where it has remained under the administration of Portugal until the mid-twentieth century—such as Goa—there was a "de-Creolisation" since various language structures were approaching the Portuguese spoken in Portugal and only traces remained in what is now the variety of Portuguese spoken by some Goan communities.

The very Goan identity remains linked to several other legacies left by Portuguese colonization, as the characteristics of Goa, as a way of life different from the rest of the country.

In addition, the presence of architectural elements and a large and significant Catholic community, despite the majority of the Indian population follows Hinduism, an estimated 25% to 30% of the 1.4 million Goans are Catholic.

Churches, convents, and Portuguese forts are scattered throughout the territory of Goa, which adds even more diversity for a country that is already rich in contrasts, as is the case in India.

Current situation 

Despite centuries of domination exercised by Portugal, unlike what happened in other Portuguese colonies elsewhere, the Portuguese language failed to spread among the vast majority of the population, remaining as the language of administration and a small literate elite.

Today, the Portuguese situation in Goa is much more dramatic. Generation after generation, the number of speakers has decreased dramatically. Since the military conquest of the colony by India in 1961, the Portuguese language has been progressively replaced by Konkani (the official language of Goa) and English (one of the two official languages of the federal administration of India).

Currently, the Portuguese language is spoken by a small community in Goa, although it is uncertain to know the exact number of people in Goa who can speak this language. Recently, attempts are now made to revive the language in Goa, including project-tests in secondary schools and artistic entities, or those of a tourist nature. Currently, the Portuguese language is learned in official and private education.

After 1961, decades after decolonization, Portugal failed to support the teaching of the language in the Goan schools.

This started a reversal trend where, Portuguese has been encouraged in schools, with the support of the Orient Foundation, and the University of Goa which has a master's degree in Portuguese studies since 1988. There are also many free courses to promote the Portuguese language, such as Communicare Trust in Dona Paula, English Language Center Instituto Camões, in Panjim, the capital, the Language Centre and the Portuguese Culture Parvatibai Chowgule College in Margao, the Friendship Society Indo-Portuguese (Indo-Portuguese Friendship Society).

According to the director of Camões of the Portuguese Language Centre and reader at the Goa University Delfim Correia da Silva, there is a gradual and steady increase in the number of pupils learning Portuguese in Goa, in a trend that has been found to significantly increase over the last eight to ten years. This trend is driven mainly by cultural and professional reasons, for opportunities linked to Brazil, Portugal, Mozambique, and Angola.

In Goa, the small number of Portuguese language speakers are united by a desire to affirm their identity and strengthen the bonds of their long encounter with the Portuguese. Even today, the Portuguese language is a sign of prestige and social status: one who speaks Portuguese is considered an elite. Currently, Portuguese is spoken and taught as a second language for a small, but significant, and important collective of Goans.

See also
Instituto Português do Oriente
Goan Catholics
Archdiocese of Goa and Damaon
Konkani language agitation
Konkani language
India–Portugal relations
Luso-Indians
Portuguese language in Asia
Norteiro Indo-Portuguese languages
Lusophony Games
RTP Internacional
Sporting de Goa
Indians in Portugal
British Goans
Fundação Oriente
Goa State Central Library
Portuguese East Indies

References

External links 
 A língua portuguesa está a ter uma morte lenta na Índia

Culture of Goa
Portuguese dialects
Goa